Karina Arroyave (born July 16, 1969) is a Colombian-American actress and playwright. Best known as Bianca Walsh on ‘’As the World Turns’’ (1988-1994), Jamey Ferrel on ‘’24’’ (2001-2002), Meirce on ‘’The Blacklist’’ (2021-2022).

Life and career
Karina Arroyave was born in Colombia and moved to New York City at the age of 1. She studied acting at Fiorello H. LaGuardia High School and later studied comedic acting at The Groundlings in Los Angeles. She made her stage debut playing the title role in Marisol at the Louisville Humana Festival. In 1993, she made her Broadway debut in the Jane Bowles' play In the Summer House.

From 1988 to 1994, Karina starred as Bianca Marquez Walsh in the CBS daytime soap opera As the World Turns. She made her film debut in 1989 drama film Lean On Me opposite Morgan Freeman and Beverly Todd. She later had supporting roles in the films Falling Down (1993), Dangerous Minds (1995), One Eight Seven (1997), In Too Deep (1999), and Crash (2004), to name a few. On television, Karina Arroyave played the role of Jamey Farrell during the first season of Fox series 24 from 2001 to 2002. Other television appearances include Criminal Minds:BEYOND BORDERS, The Mysteries of Laura, Law & Order, Law & Order: Special Victims Unit, New York Undercover, The Practice, NYPD Blue and Blue Bloods.

In 2019, Arroyave played Karla Córdova, a Salvadoran detainee, during the final season of Netflix comedy-drama, Orange Is the New Black.

Filmography

References

в 1992 снималась в фильме Falling Down (С меня хватит!) в роли - Анжелики

External links

1969 births
Living people
Colombian film actresses
Colombian television actresses
20th-century Colombian actresses
21st-century Colombian actresses